Lamartine Babo (10 January 1904 — 16 June 1963) was one of the most important popular composers of Brazil. Babo composed several of satirical sambas, marchinhas and other songs; he is especially remembered for composing anthems for all the main professional football clubs of Rio de Janeiro (América, Bangu, Bonsucesso, Botafogo, Canto do Rio, Flamengo, Fluminense, Madureira, Olaria, São Cristóvão, and Vasco da Gama).

References

External links 
 
 

1904 births
1963 deaths
Brazilian composers
Musicians from Rio de Janeiro (city)
20th-century composers